Mugra Para is a union parishad, the smallest administrative body of Bangladesh, located in Sonargaon Upazila, Narayanganj District, Bangladesh. The total population is 24115.

References

Unions of Sonargaon Upazila